ProMedica Fostoria Community Hospital is a public hospital in Fostoria, Ohio that is part of the ProMedica Health System.

External links
Fostoria Community Hospital

Hospitals in Ohio
Fostoria, Ohio
Hospitals with year of establishment missing